Negaah TV is a television channel run by ethnic Hazaras. It is based in the Omid-e Sabz township of Kabul, Afghanistan.

See also 
 Television in Afghanistan
 Rah-e-Farda Radio & Television Network

References

External links 
 www.negaah.tv

Television in Afghanistan
Persian-language television stations
Mass media in Kabul
Hazaragi-language television stations